Alvin Duke Chandler (August 18, 1902 – May 26, 1987) was the twenty-first president of the College of William & Mary, serving from 1951 to 1960. He also served as the chancellor of The Colleges of William & Mary from 1960 to 1962; after that system was disbanded, he served as Chancellor of the College from 1962 to 1974.  Prior to his career at the College of William & Mary, Chandler served in the United States Navy, eventually reaching the rank of vice-admiral. His father, Julian Alvin Carroll Chandler, also served as president of the College of William & Mary. His personal papers  as well as the papers from his time as president  can be found in the Special Collections Research Center at the College of William & Mary.

Naval officer (1923–1951)
Chandler attended William and Mary in 1918–1919, prior to his appointment to the U.S. Naval Academy, graduating in 1923.

Commander Chandler was a student at the Naval War College about 1936-1938.

During the Guadalcanal Campaign Cdr Chandler commanded Destroyer Division 41 in the Battle of Rennell Island. USS Chevalier (DD-451), USS Edwards (DD-619), USS Meade (DD-602), and USS Taylor (DD-468) made up his force.

He was director of logistics plans for the U.S. Navy when he retired to accept the presidency of the College of William & Mary (1951).

Educator (1951–1974)
The Board of Visitors appointed Admiral Chandler president of the College of William & Mary in haste, and outraged the faculty by failing to consult them.  His predecessor had been forced out of office following a scandal over changing grades for football players on the college team.  After taking office, he instituted uniform admission standards for all students.  During his tenure, he oversaw the expansion of the faculty, curriculum changes, and the construction of five new buildings.  He left office to become chancellor of the Colleges of William & Mary (1960–1962), until the General Assembly of Virginia made those five public colleges independent.  Then he was chancellor of the college (1962–1974).

The faculty were unhappy with President Chandler when state law required that they subscribe to loyalty oaths.  A star professor decamped for McGill University, and faculty recruiting suffered.

Students chafed at censorship of their publications, restrictions on drinking, and requirements for chaperones.

Death
On 26 May 1987, Alvin died in the Virginia Beach General Hospital, age 84.

References

External links
Finding aid for the Alvin Duke Chandler Papers
Finding aid for Office of the President. Alvin Duke Chandler

1987 deaths
1902 births
Presidents of the College of William & Mary
Chancellors of the College of William & Mary
College of William & Mary alumni 
United States Naval Academy alumni
United States Navy vice admirals
United States Navy personnel of World War II
Military personnel from Richmond, Virginia
Recipients of the Legion of Merit